Yadhira Carrillo Villalobos (born May 12, 1973) is a Mexican actress, model and beauty queen.

Early career
Yadhira Carrillo was chosen Nuestra Belleza Aguascalientes in 1994, the state qualifier for the national Nuestra Belleza México, to determine Mexico's contestant for the Miss Universe 1995 competition. Carrillo finished as first-runner-up at the Nuestra Belleza México 1994.

After this, Carrillo entered the Centro de Educación Artística (CEA), planning for a career in performing arts.

Acting career
After a "special appearance" in the telenovela Canción de amor, producer Carla Estrada offered Carrillo the supporting role of Teresa in the telenovela Te Sigo Amando (I still love you).  She worked with Estrada again playing Josefina in María Isabel.
After appearing in several episodes of Mujer, casos de la vida real, and portraying a villain in the TV-special Mas allá de la Usurpadora, she received her first co-starring role in El Niño que vino del mar (The Boy Who Came From The Sea).

Producer Ernesto Alonso hired Carrillo for the role of the antagonist in El precio de tu amor (The Price of Your Love). This was followed by a duo-role in the 2002 telenovela La Otra (The Other Woman), where she played two characters who are polar opposites; Carlota Guillen, a good natured daughter who is abused, subjugated and manipulated by her mother, and Cordelia Portugal, a manipulative gold digger.

In addition to her career in Mexico, Carrillo debuted abroad with a role in the Spanish telenovela El Secreto (The Secret), in which she plays a perverse ex fiancée of the protagonist, played by fellow Mexican actor Eduardo Capetillo. In 2004 Carrillo was the protagonist in Amarte es mi Pecado (Loving You is My Sin), and also played a special guest star role in Rubí, as Elena Navarro. In 2005 she starred in Barrera de Amor (Barrier of Love).

Carrillo retired from acting in 2008.

Personal life
She was married to Michael Kuhn. In 2012 she married Juan Collado, ex-husband of Leticia Calderón.

Filmography

Film

Television

Awards and nominations

Notes

References

External links 

1972 births
Living people
Mexican telenovela actresses
Mexican television actresses
Mexican stage actresses
Mexican female models
Mexican television presenters
Actresses from Aguascalientes
20th-century Mexican actresses
21st-century Mexican actresses
People from Aguascalientes City
Mexican women television presenters